Young Americans for Freedom (YAF) is a conservative youth activism organization that was founded in 1960 as a coalition between traditional conservatives and libertarians on American college campuses. It is a 501(c)(3) nonprofit organization and the chapter affiliate of Young America's Foundation. The purposes of YAF are to advocate public policies consistent with the Sharon Statement, which was adopted by young conservatives at a meeting at the home of William F. Buckley in Sharon, Connecticut, on September 11, 1960.

While the 1960s were its most successful years in terms of numbers and influence, YAF has experienced a resurgence in recent years, becoming active as a national organization with chapters on college and high school campuses throughout the United States. YAF's official publication is The New Guard.

History

Volatile early years
Historians have documented the volatility inside YAF during its early years as a coalition of conservatives and libertarians. Kenneth Heineman writes, "YAF itself suffered internal strife. In 1969 the organization split into competing, irreconcilable factions."  Gregory L. Schneider states, "In the mid-1970s YAF suffered from weak leadership based on factions and personalities rather than ability". Jerome Tuccile writes, "The second faction of rebels consisted of radical libertarians or anarchists, most of them belonging to Karl Hess IV's Anarcho-libertarian Alliance. This contingent was more interested in splitting off from YAF entirely."  Rebecca E. Klatch writes, "When one young libertarian burned his draft card on the convention floor, the crowd turned into an angry mob and, ultimately, purged all libertarians from YAF. One libertarian faction stormed out of the meeting."

National conservative activism, 1960–65
In September 1960, about 90 young people met at the childhood home of [[William F. Buckley, Jr.] in Sharon, Connecticut.] They gathered to lay the groundwork for a new national conservative youth organization. It is here that Young Americans for Freedom was born and their statement of principles, the Sharon Statement, was drafted. The New Guard magazine made its debut as the official magazine of YAF in 1961. In the first four years of its existence, YAF grew rapidly on college campuses.

Ronald Reagan joined the YAF National Advisory Board in 1962 and for 42 years served as the Honorary Chairman.

In the 1960s, the Republican Party was divided between its conservative wing, led by Barry Goldwater, and its more liberal wing, led by Nelson Rockefeller. YAF members fell squarely on Goldwater's side and spearheaded the campaign of Barry Goldwater for president. However, some members had sympathy with the conservative Southern Democrats known as Dixiecrats, and thus from its inception YAF was deliberately non-partisan.

On March 7, 1962, a YAF-sponsored conservative rally filled Madison Square Garden in New York City, drawing 18,000 people. In attendance was Barry Goldwater. The event has been described as "the birthday of the conservative movement."

The second national YAF convention was held in 1963 at the Gault Hotel in Florida. With over 450 voting delegates in attendance. Hotel management at the Gault Hotel refused accommodations to Don Parker, an African-American delegate from Brooklyn. As word of this spread around the YAFers in attendance, a number of delegates and numerous others began gathering in the lobby of the hotel demanding that either the Gault Hotel allow all the black YAFers to stay and the hotel change its segregation policy or YAF would move the convention to another site. From that day on any person was allowed into the Gault Hotel.

By 1964, YAF was a major force in the campaign to nominate Goldwater, and then after his nomination, to elect him president. Goldwater's run for the White House catalyzed YAF more than any other event in its history. Lee Edwards, former New Guard editor, said "Barry Goldwater made YAF, but YAF also made Barry Goldwater." Goldwater's massive defeat in the presidential election of 1964 demoralized many YAF members.

In YAF's campaign to "STOP RED TRADE", IBM, Mack Truck, and Firestone Tire and Rubber were targeted for engaging in high visibility trade with the Soviet Bloc. YAF stopped Firestone's attempt to build a synthetic rubber plant in communist Romania through letter-writing campaigns, boycotts, and demonstrations. YAF's plan to distribute 500,000 flyers at the Indianapolis 500 was seen as a key to the decision by Firestone executives to cancel their Romanian plans in April 1965.

YAF faced opposition from groups like the American Nazi Party because of the presence of Jews in the organization and its close relationship with Marvin Liebman. However, YAF did honor Senator from South Carolina Strom Thurmond, a segregationist, with its Freedom Award in 1962. An unsubstantiated claim has been made that a YAF member was involved with the 'Welcome Mr. Kennedy to Dallas' ad placed in the Dallas Morning News (coincidentally on the morning of JFK's assassination), which accused him of ignoring the Constitution.

Reaction to radical activism, 1965–71
Liberalism and radicalism dominated campuses from the mid-1960s until the early 1970s, primarily as a result of the civil rights movement and the Vietnam War. Though outnumbered, YAF went on the offensive against radical left-wing organizations by challenging and rebutting groups like Students for a Democratic Society (SDS) and New MOBE in support of a U.S. victory in Vietnam.

YAF members tended to hold similar opinions to their older compatriots within the conservative movement. YAF began and continued a number of projects to support Vietnam veterans and their causes. "Project Appreciation" gave YAFers the opportunity to write, visit, and provide needed supplies to hospitalized veterans. YAF worked on various POW/MIA issues. In a protest in Santa Monica in 1979, the YAF focused protests and a personal attack on Jane Fonda by hanging an effigy of her outside her house due to her opposition to the Vietnam War.

A faction of YAF philosophically extended the group's traditional support of limited government in economic issues to social issues and a foreign policy of non-interventionism. This group came to be known as libertarians. A more serious and lasting challenge for YAF came from this group, those who believed in limited or even no government – radical libertarians and anarchists.  YAF's Libertarian and Anarchist Caucuses were purged at the YAF's 1969 national convention in St. Louis, and members of this faction were among the founding members of the Libertarian Party in 1971.

Advocacy politics, 1971–85
In the 1970s, YAF became much older, demographically speaking. Rather than merely staging campus demonstrations, they focused on influencing national politics by lobbying and occasionally staging and publicizing small demonstrations. 

YAF went on the offensive when President Nixon enacted wage controls, price controls, abandoned the gold standard, and opened relations with the communist People's Republic of China, ceasing relations with Taiwan. YAF felt he was abandoning conservative principles so YAF publicly denounced the administration for these moves, becoming the first conservative organization to do so.

A number of YAF projects were started as ad hoc committees and affiliated groups to address specific issues. These groups include Youth for the Voluntary Prayer Amendment, Student's Committee for the Right to Keep and Bear Arms, Young America's Foundation, Free Campus News Service, STOP-NSA Committee, and the National Student Committee for Victory in Vietnam.

In 1974, YAF, along with the American Conservative Union, sponsored a modest and ambitious gathering called the Conservative Political Action Conference (CPAC). CPAC has become the largest annual gathering of conservatives and is still held annually in the DC area.

On college campuses, YAF was more conservative and less partisan than the College Republicans. Members were willing to oppose liberal candidates and support conservative candidates regardless of party affiliation. During many local and national races throughout this era, YAF members were divided about whether to support a moderately conservative electable candidate or to support a staunchly conservative long-shot candidate.

YAF supported Reagan's almost-successful bid to win the Republican presidential nomination in 1976 and his victorious race for the presidency in 1980.

The YAF targeted the Carter Administration, and YAF was active in opposing the Panama Canal and SALT treaties. The Iran Hostage Crisis focused public criticism on the Carter Administration and provided YAF a rallying point in 1979. YAF held a campaign to generate thousands of letters of encouragement to the hostages and pressed the Administration to take action.

In 1980, Young Conservatives of Texas was formed by a group of YAF members in Texas that broke off to found their own organization. Since that time, YAF itself has never had a major presence in the state. That same year, YAF's long-time friend and advisor Ronald Reagan became the 40th President of the United States. The election of Reagan ushered in the conservative decade. YAFers around the nation mobilized in support of Reagan's agenda.

Many YAFers received appointments to the Reagan Administration. Reagan Administration officials and prospective appointees who were targeted by the radical left were strongly defended by YAF. YAFers rallied to the support of Labor Secretary Raymond Donovan, Interior Secretary James Watt, Circuit Court Judge Dan Manion, Supreme Court nominee Robert Bork, and NSC staff member Lt. Colonel Oliver North.

By the mid-1980s, many of YAF's leaders were in their thirties and long out of college. Some of them held positions in government while continuing to run the organization as a lobbying and fund-raising group for conservative causes. At the same time, internal problems paralyzed the YAF hierarchy. The national board was controlled by lawyers and lobbyists who focused on fundraising.  This era ended with financial problems which led to YAF losing most of its assets.

Campus activism, 1985–90
After a financial collapse, most of the older members went on to other things, while younger members dominated YAF. During this era, a new generation of liberal and radical activism was growing on college campuses, and members began focusing on opposing these movements. This growth was strongest in California, where members staged protests in favor of aid to the Nicaraguan Contras, in favor of Reagan's anti-communist policies and in opposition to the United Nations.

The emphasis on campus activism gradually spread to all the states where YAF was still active. In 1989, an alliance of Californian and New York activists took over a majority of the seats on the national board.

Rebuilding years, 1991–99
Though the presence of National YAF was lax during the 1990s as they were focusing on revitalizing and rebuilding the organization, there remained very active pockets of YAF activity throughout the country, campus charters and statewide units that organized and operated on their own. California YAF continued as a strong conservative force on campuses and in that state's political arena. Many states like Florida, Massachusetts, Michigan, Pennsylvania, New York, Virginia and others still had very active individual campus chapters.

By 1991, the national board of YAF contained a majority of Californians – the first time a single state had had a majority in the governing council. However, this new régime found itself unable to effectively run YAF as a financial and organizational entity. The strength of its activism was shattered by the Gulf War that began in January 1991. Most members considered President George H. W. Bush to be insufficiently conservative, and his rhetoric justifying the war – "a new world order" – to be dangerously utopian. While conservative-oriented students on campuses around the country were showing support for the American effort against Saddam Hussein's invasion of Kuwait, many YAF leaders of the time were expressing opposition to the war effort. Thus, an opportunity to expand the organization's membership was lost.

In August 1991, YAF held its 16th National Convention in Washington D.C. YAF members from around the country gathered to reaffirm its commitment to conservative principles and heard such speakers as William F. Buckley, Jr., Secretary of Defense Dick Cheney, and G. Gordon Liddy. The following year, YAF National Chairman Jeff Wright met with Vice President Dan Quayle and delivered over 40,000 petitions in support of his renomination as Vice President. YAF launched an Anita Hill Truth Squad and YAFers confronted Anita Hill on college campuses across America. YAF pushed the 1992 Republican National Convention to continue strong support for conservative issues.

At the 1995 Conservative Political Action Conference, YAF held a "Colloquium on Revolution." Young Americans for Freedom members rallied around speakers such as YAF founding elder Howard Phillips, Congressman Robert Dornan, Joseph Sobran, and other speakers motivating the young crowds to continue YAF's conservative charge to preserve freedom and individual liberty. In 1996, National chairman Jon Pastore led a delegation of YAFers to bring national attention to a group called the North American Man/Boy Love Association (NAMBLA). NAMBLA members got quite a surprise at one of their events in Washington DC in 1996 when YAFers held banners warning the effects of 'deviant and un-natural sexual practices.'

In 1997, Brian Park, National Director and state Chairman of California YAF, organized support for the rights of American Indians when their tribal sovereignty was being encroached upon by Governor Pete Wilson.
Full page newspaper ads centered on YAF's resolution to support tribal sovereignty were placed in every major newspaper across the state of California to pressure the Governor. The negotiations failed and the historic Proposition 5 was placed on the ballot in 1998. YAF made over 1 million voter contacts with direct-mail pieces to educate the public on American Indian Sovereignty issues and the measure passed overwhelmingly with bi-partisan support of 62.4% to 32.6%. Proposition 5 was eventually challenged in the courts and YAF filed a "Friends of the Court" brief (case number S074850) with the State Supreme court in 1999. Though YAF lost, its leg work assisted in a passage of Proposition 1A in year 2000 with no real opposition to fix the legal problems with Proposition 5.

In 1998 Cigar-Man was launched against President Bill Clinton. A YAFer dressed in a Cigar-Costume followed President Clinton to various fundraising functions to highlight Clinton's presidential achievements.

At the 1999 Academy Awards in Los Angeles, YAFers rallied in support of the Academy of Motion Pictures decision to award famous director Elia Kazan with the lifetime achievement award. Confronted by over 600 union activists and other leftists YAFers continued with their peaceful pro-Kazan rally. When the rally turned ugly YAFers defended themselves and assisted the police to apprehend the violent leftist perpetrators. 

Later in the 1990s, YAF returned to national advocacy politics. The national office organized petition drives and staged a variety of events to promote the conservative viewpoint on a variety of public issues. Some of these events would have an attention-grabbing theme such as "Pardon Oliver North" and "Impeach Janet Reno".

Resurgence, 2000–10

In 2007, the YAF chapter at Michigan State University organized protests against legislation enacting anti-discrimination protection for transgender individuals. Ten years later, Grant Strobl, YAF's national chairman, said the Michigan State chapter was not chartered and had associated itself with YAF without authorization.

Beginning in 2009, Young Americans for Freedom has organized a number of new college chapters to supplement the long-standing units on campuses such as Penn State. On college campuses, YAF chapters have been involved in activities including sponsoring conservative speakers, rallies supporting the armed forces, advocacy of strict control of illegal immigration, demonstrations against affirmative action and protesting liberal campus speakers.

In 2009, YAF, a coalition of Tea Party groups, retired police and firefighter association, and Keep America Safe hosted the "9/11 Never Forget" Rally in New York City. The Coalition united to fight the decision of U.S. Attorney General Eric Holder to try the 9/11 co-conspirators in New York City's federal court. The coalition claimed Holder's decision gave alleged war criminals the same rights as American citizens; it also said trying the defendants in New York City would endanger the citizenry. The rally brought nationwide attention to Holder's decision and eventually led the Department of Justice and the Obama administration to move the trial from New York City.

Modern history, 2010-present

On March 16, 2011, Young Americans for Freedom passed National Board Resolution #001, unifying the Young America's Foundation with Young Americans for Freedom on April 1, 2011. Young America's Foundation provides students with speakers, activism programs, conferences and opportunities to learn about Ronald Reagan's accomplishments by visiting his beloved ranch, Rancho del Cielo, in Santa Barbara, California. Young America's Foundation has brought speakers like Ben Shapiro and David Horowitz to College Republican groups across the United States, as well as to broader university venues.

As of May 16, 2011 Young Americans for Freedom officially became a project of Young America's Foundation. The existing board members of Young Americans for Freedom, at the time of the unification, became part of a newly formed [board of governors]. Existing YAF chapters were brought under the auspices of the Foundation.

Today, the unification has concluded. Current chapters receive a wide variety of materials, training, support, and encouragement based on YAF's decades of activism experience.

Influence
From its beginning as an outgrowth of the efforts to obtain the Republican vice-presidential nomination for a conservative in 1960 to its determined campaign to ensure that a conservative vice-president (Dan Quayle) was renominated in 1992, YAF was a major player in late 20th century American politics.

Karl Zinsmeister wrote the following about YAF:

Although YAF members and chapters were engaged in many projects to influence public policy and elect conservative candidates to office, the leadership of the organization was well aware that their goals and objectives were more long-term. YAF was recruiting, training and preparing young people to assume even more important roles later in life. YAF spawned many of the organizational elements of the 21st-century conservative movement and provided the leadership and manpower to build those publications, organizations, and foundations into the significant elements of American society that they are today.

Creating a conservative movement
YAF played a critical role in the development of many of the new conservative organizations that were established in the 1960s, 1970s, and beyond. Many college students and young adults active in YAF went on to form new groups or serve as important personnel in conservative organizations founded by others.

Conservative or libertarian organizations

Conservative or libertarian organizations YAF members founded or in which they played an important contributing role include:
 American Conservative Union – founded in 1964 – William F. Buckley, David R. Jones & others.
 The Fund for American Studies – founded in 1966 – David R. Jones, Charles Edison, Dr. Walter Judd, Marvin Liebman and William F. Buckley Jr.
  The American Spectator – founded in 1967 – Publisher Alfred S. Regnery; Editor-in-Chief R. Emmett Tyrrell, Jr. (both YAF alumni)
 Reason Foundation – founded in 1968 – Robert W. Poole Jr.
 Conservative Victory Fund – founded in 1969 – Congressman John Ashbrook & Tom Winter.
 Young America's Foundation – founded in 1969 – Students at Vanderbilt University, Ron Robinson (YAF) & others
 The Libertarian Party of America – founded in 1971 – David Nolan
 American Legislative Exchange Council – founded in 1973 – Kathy King Rothschild, assisted by Connie Campanella.
 Conservative Political Action Conference – started in 1974 – Young Americans for Freedom, American Conservative Union, Human Events & National Review
 The Conservative Caucus – founded in 1974 – Howard Phillips
 The Second Amendment Foundation – founded in 1974 – Alan Gotlieb; Treasurer Sam Slom, Hawaii State Senator and YAF alumnus
 The National Journalism Center – founded in 1977 – M. Stanton Evans
 Cato Institute – founded in 1977 – David Boaz
 The Lincoln Institute for Research and Education – founded in 1978 – Jay A. Parker
 The Leadership Institute – founded in 1979 – Morton Blackwell
 Young Conservatives of Texas – founded in 1980 – Steve Munisteri
 The Ludwig von Mises Institute – founded in 1982 – Lewellyn Rockwell
 The National Center for Public Policy Research – founded in 1982 – Amy Moritz Ridenour.
 The Institute for Policy Innovation – founded in 1987 – Peter Ferrara
 The Media Research Center – founded in 1987 – L. Brent Bozell III & Brent Baker
 Citizens United – founded in 1988 – Floyd Brown
 The American Policy Center – founded in 1988 – Tom DeWeese
 The Goldwater Institute – founded in 1988 – Dr. Michael Sanera
 The National Legal and Policy Center – founded in 1991 – Kenneth Boehm 
 Clare Boothe Luce Policy Institute – founded in 1993 – Michelle Easton
 The Thomas Jefferson Institute – founded in *** – Michael Thompson, Chris Braulich, Randal C. Teague & Robert Turner.
 Grasstops USA – founded in 2004 – Christoper Carmouche

Notable alumni

In public office

 U.S. President Ronald Reagan, former YAF Honorary National Chairman
 U.S. Vice President Dan Quayle
 U.S. Attorney General Jeff Sessions
 Former U.S. Senator and U.S. Court of Appeals Judge James Buckley
 U.S. Representative Dana Rohrabacher
 U.S. Representative Ed Royce
 U.S. Representative James Sensenbrenner
 U.S. Representative Ted Poe
 U.S. Representative Peter King
 U.S. Representative Chuck Fleischmann
 U.S. Representative Jeb Hensarling
 Former U.S. Representative Donald Manzullo
 U.S. Representative Jimmy Duncan
 Former U.S. Representative Robert E. Bauman, YAF Chairman, ACU founder and national chairman
 Securities and Exchange Commission Chairman Christopher Cox
 U.S. Circuit Court Judges Daniel A. Manion, Alice M. Batchelder, Jerry Edwin Smith, David B. Sentelle, Danny Boggs, Randall Rader, Diarmuid O'Scannlain, and Paul V. Niemeyer
 California legislator Pat Nolan, former California chairman
 Former Louisiana State Representative Woody Jenkins
 Former Louisiana State Representative and State Senator Dan Richey

In the conservative movement

 David Keene, Opinion Editor of The Washington Times, Former President of National Rifle Association and former Chairman of American Conservative Union
 David J. Porter of Giddings, Texas, Railroad Commission of Texas
 James Bopp Jr., Attorney and Republican National Committeeman from Indiana
 Dr. Lee Edwards, Historian, founding YAF member and founding editor of YAF's New Guard Magazine
 M. Stanton Evans, YAF founder and writer
 Richard Viguerie, Fundraiser, founder of direct mail marketing, and YAF's first executive director
 Deroy Murdock, Syndicated columnist
 Mark Levin, Syndicated talk-show host
 Katie Pavlich, Journalist

Philosophy

Since its founding, YAF continuously identified itself as "conservative". However, the term "conservative" has changed in meaning over several generations. Before World War II, most American conservatives were non-interventionist. But as the Cold War began to dominate American foreign policy, the old conservatism disintegrated. After Robert A. Taft was defeated for the Republican nomination in 1952, non-interventionist conservatism mostly vanished. In the 1950s, a new kind of conservatism arose. This new ideology was formulated in large part by the newspaper Human Events, the magazine National Review, and its editor William F. Buckley Jr. This new conservatism combined free-market economics, respect for traditional values, orderly society and anti-communism.

In the late 1960s, the term libertarianism began to be used for a political philosophy. Many of those who popularized this term were initially part of the conservative movement, but came to separate themselves from the conservatives on certain issues. Libertarians within YAF believed, for example, the military draft was a violation of the individual freedom the organization claimed to embrace. To oppose it they were willing to reject existing laws against burning draft cards and supported those who fled to Canada or went underground when drafted for military service. The conservatives (or traditionalists as they were sometimes called) also opposed the draft directed their efforts towards changing the law. In the end, the goals of both groups were achieved, and YAF was "in the forefront of the drive to end the draft and create a volunteer military."

After 1969, the relationship between conservatives and libertarians in YAF was often rocky. A majority of members identified themselves simply as conservative, but some identified as both conservative and libertarian, and still others identified themselves simply as libertarian. From time to time, power struggles broke out; when this happened, the libertarians almost always ended up losing. In later years, new viewpoints would be amalgamated by the conservative movement, including neoconservatism in the early 1970s, the New Right in the late 1970s and the Religious Right in the 1980s. Some YAF members identified with some of these philosophies, others opposed them and still others were content to simply identify themselves as conservative without further specificity.

Publications

Periodicals
 Libertas
 The New Guard

Reports
 Annual Report 2019.

References

Further reading
 Andrew, John A., III.  The Other Side of the Sixties: Young Americans for Freedom and the Rise of Conservative Politics. New Brunswick: Rutgers University Press (1997), 286 pages.  (paper). Covers the history of YAF from 1960 to 1964.
 Andrew, John. "Pro-War and Anti-Draft: Young Americans for Freedom and the War in Vietnam." in  Marc J. Gilbert ed. The Vietnam War on Campus: Other Voices, More Distant Drums pp: 1-19.

 Crawford, Alan. Thunder on the Right: The "New Right" and the Politics of Resentment.  New York: Pantheon Books (1980), 381 pages.  (paper). A negative portrayal of 1970s and 1980s conservatism, including much material on YAF.
 Klatch, Rebecca E. A Generation Divided. Berkeley: University of California Press (1999), 334 pages. . A scholarly and academic work with many references to Young Americans for Freedom, SDS, and campus activism of the 1960s and early 1970s.
 Nash, George H. The Conservative Intellectual Movement in America Since 1945.  Wilmington, Delaware: Intercollegiate Studies Institute (1996), 467 pages. . A history of the different strains of conservative ideology from 1945 until 1976, updated to 1996 in the second edition.
 Rusher, William A. The Rise of the Right. New York: National Review Books (1993), 261 pages. . A history of American political conservatism from 1953 until 1981, updated to 1993 in the second edition. Includes much material on YAF.

 Schneider, Gregory L. Cadres for Conservatism: Young Americans for Freedom and the Rise of the Contemporary Right. New York University Press (1999), 263 pages. . Covers the history of YAF from 1960 to 1985.
 Thorburn, Wayne.  A Generation Awakes: Young Americans for Freedom and the Creation of the Conservative Movement.  Ottawa, Ill: Jameson Books (2010), 564 pages. . Covers the history of YAF from 1960 to the mid-1990s.

External links

 Official website
 “Break On Through (to the Other Side)”: An Overview of The Historiography of U.S. Conservatism in the Sixties

Youth organizations established in 1960
Political organizations based in the United States
Student political organizations in the United States
Conservative organizations in the United States
Libertarian organizations based in the United States
501(c)(3) organizations
1960 establishments in the United States
Political youth organizations in the United States